Fatma Lanouar (Arabic: فاطمة لأنور; born March 14, 1978) is a former female middle distance runner from Tunisia. She is best known for twice (2001 and 2005) winning the gold medal at the Mediterranean Games in the women's 1500 metres. Lanouar set her personal best (4:06.91) in the 1,500 metres in 2000. She was also the silver medallist at the 2001 Jeux de la Francophonie.

Competition record

References

External links

1978 births
Living people
Tunisian female middle-distance runners
Athletes (track and field) at the 2000 Summer Olympics
Olympic athletes of Tunisia
Mediterranean Games gold medalists for Tunisia
Mediterranean Games medalists in athletics
Athletes (track and field) at the 2001 Mediterranean Games
Athletes (track and field) at the 2005 Mediterranean Games
Athletes (track and field) at the 1999 All-Africa Games
Athletes (track and field) at the 2007 All-Africa Games
African Games competitors for Tunisia
20th-century Tunisian women
21st-century Tunisian women